The Göksu waterfall is located on the Göksu, a tributary of the Kızılırmak river, near the large village of Sizir in the vicinity of Gemerek in the Turkish province of Sivas. A hydroelectric plant was erected on the Göksu river twenty-five years ago by the General Directorate of the Iller Bank in order to supply the city of Kayseri with electricity, but was later attached to the national grid.

The Karstic springs arising from the skirts of the Ali Dag mountain in the village of Sizir have been diverted by the construction of a dam into a canal leading to the hydroelectric plant, with the result that, like most of our waterfalls, the Göksu fall is worth visiting only in very rainy seasons.

Waterfalls of Turkey
Landforms of Kayseri Province